Jigyasa Singh (born 25 June 1994) is an Indian television actress. She is known for her portrayal of Thapki in Thapki Pyar Ki, Thapki Pyar Ki 2 and Heer Singh in Shakti - Astitva Ke Ehsaas Ki.

Early life and education
Singh was born in Dehradun, India. She did her schooling from Jaipur. She completed her master's degree in journalism from Delhi University.

Career
Singh made her debut as Alia with Zee Marudhara's Chore Tera Gaon Bada Pyaara. Next, she appeared in Channel V India's episodic series Gumrah: End of Innocence as Supriya.

From May 2015 to July 2017, she portrayed Vaani "Thapki" Chaturvedi and Bani Malhotra in Colors TV's Thapki Pyar Ki. In 2018, Singh joined Colors TV's Dev 2 as Dhwani Karchiwala. In 2019, she played Tara Khanna in Star Plus's Nazar.

In January 2020, she began appearing as Heer Singh in Colors TV's Shakti - Astitva Ke Ehsaas Ki. She quit the show in August 2021 to reprise her role of Thapki in the spiritual sequel of Thapki Pyar Ki, entitled Thapki Pyar Ki 2, which is on air on Colors TV in October 2021. She quit the show in February 2022 owing to health issues.

Filmography

Television

Special appearances

Music videos

Awards and nominations 
She was nominated for Best Debutante as Thapki in Zee Gold Awards 2016.

See also 
 List of Indian television actresses

References

External links 
 
 

Living people
Indian television actresses
Place of birth missing (living people)
People from Jaipur
Delhi University alumni
1994 births